The 2012 NCAA Division II women's basketball tournament was the 31st annual tournament hosted by the NCAA to determine the national champion of Division II women's  collegiate basketball in the United States.

Shaw defeated Ashland in the championship game, 88–82 after one overtime period, to claim the Bears' first NCAA Division II national title.

The championship rounds were contested at Bill Greehey Arena on the campus of the St. Mary's University in San Antonio, Texas.

Regionals

East - Waltham, Massachusetts
Location: Dana Center Host: Bentley College

Central - Wayne, Nebraska
Location: Rice Auditorium Host: Wayne State College

Midwest - Ashland, Ohio
Location: Kates Gymnasium Host: Ashland University

West - La Jolla, California
Location: RIMAC Arena Host: University of California, San Diego

South - Winter Park, Florida
Location: Alfond Sports Center Host: Rollins College

Southeast - Aiken, South Carolina
Location: USCA Convocation Center Host: University of South Carolina-Aiken

Atlantic - Edinboro, Pennsylvania
Location: McComb Fieldhouse Host: Edinboro University of Pennsylvania

South Central - Topeka, Kansas
Location: Lee Arena Host: Washburn University

Elite Eight - San Antonio, Texas
Location: Bill Greehey Arena Host: Saint Mary's University

All-tournament team
 Kyria Buford, Shaw
 Sequoyah Griffin, Shaw
 Jena Stutzman, Ashland
 Kari Daugherty, Ashland
 Jacqui Brugliera, Bentley

See also
 NCAA Women's Division II Basketball Championship
 2012 NCAA Division II men's basketball tournament

References
 2012 NCAA Division II women's basketball tournament jonfmorse.com

 
NCAA Division II women's basketball tournament
2012 in sports in Texas
Basketball in San Antonio